HALCA (Highly Advanced Laboratory for Communications and Astronomy), also known for its project name VSOP (VLBI Space Observatory Programme), the code name MUSES-B (for the second of the Mu Space Engineering Spacecraft series), or just Haruka (はるか) was a Japanese 8 meter diameter radio telescope satellite which was used for Very Long Baseline Interferometry (VLBI). It was the first such space-borne dedicated VLBI mission.

History
It was placed in a highly elliptical orbit with an apogee altitude of 21,400 km and a perigee altitude of 560 km, with an orbital period of approximately 6.3 hours. This orbit allowed imaging of celestial radio sources by the satellite in conjunction with an array of ground-based radio telescopes, such that both good (u,v) plane coverage and very high resolution were obtained.

Although designed to observe in three frequency bands: 1.6 GHz, 5.0 GHz, and 22 GHz, it was found that the sensitivity of the 22 GHz band had severely degraded after orbital deployment, probably caused by vibrational deformation of the dish shape at launch, thus limiting observations to the 1.6 GHz and 5.0 GHz bands.

HALCA was launched in February 1997 from Kagoshima Space Center, and made its final VSOP observations in October 2003, far exceeding its 3-year predicted lifespan, before the loss of attitude control. All operations were officially ended in November 2005.

A follow-up mission ASTRO-G (VSOP-2) was planned, with a proposed launch date of 2012, but the project was eventually cancelled in 2011 due to increasing costs and the difficulties of achieving its science goals. It was expected to achieve resolutions up to ten times higher and up to ten times greater sensitivity than its predecessor HALCA.

The cancellation of ASTRO-G left the Russian Spektr-R mission as the only then operational space VLBI facility.

Antenna 
The large 8 meter antenna was designed to unfold in space as the unfolded configuration did not fit inside the rocket fairing. The antenna was a metal mesh of 6000 cables. To form an ideal shape the length of the cables were adjusted on the backside of the antenna. One concern was that the cables could entangle. The deployment of the main reflector started on February 27, 1997. The deployment was done over three hours on the first day and was completed in 20 minutes during the next day.

Highlights
Observations of hydroxyl masers and pulsars at 1.6 GHz
Detection of interference fringes for quasar PKS1519-273 between HALCA and terrestrial radio telescopes
Routines imaging of quasars and radio galaxies etc. by means of experimental VLBI observations with HALCA and terrestrial radio telescope networks

Gallery

References

External links

 HALCA
 VSOP

Radio telescopes
Space telescopes
Satellites of Japan
Spacecraft launched in 1997